Melanie Walsh (born Bushey, Hertfordshire, 18 July 1964) is an English writer and illustrator of children's books. She studied at Harrow School of Art and the Royal College of Art. 
In 1982, she illustrated her first book Janet in the Snow. by Charlotte McDerrin.
Walsh has written over 40 books. Her books have been translated into nine different languages.

When We Grow Up: A First Book Of Jobs,  Publication date: 01 Jul 2021 Walker Books
Goodbye Grandma,  Publication Date 2014 Walker Books
10 Things I Can Do to Help My World, Publication date: 08/26/2008 Walker Books
Big and Little, Publication date: 08/28/2001 Walker Books
Do Donkeys Dance?, Publication date: 03/28/2000 
Do Donkeys Dance?, Publication date: 03/29/2002
Do Lions Live on Lily Pads?, Publication date: 06/12/2006 Egmont Books
Do Lions Live on Lily Pads?, Publication date: 01/31/2006 Egmont Books
Do Monkeys Tweet?, Publication date: 09/29/1997Heinemann Books
Do Monkeys Tweet?, Publication date: 10/25/1999 Heinemann Books
Do Pigs Have Stripes?, Publication date: 10/25/1999 Heinemann Books
Do Pigs Have Stripes?, Publication date: 04/28/1996 Heinemann Books
Farm Animals, Publication date: 04/01/2002 Campbell Books
Hide and Sleep, Publication date: 09/29/1999 DK publishing
Minnie and Her Baby Brother, Publication date: 07/15/2003 Walker Books
My Beak, Your Beak, Publication date: 09/28/2002 Transworld Books
My Nose, Your Nose, Publication date: 10/23/2003 Transworld Books
My Nose, Your Nose, Publication date: 09/28/2002 Transworld Books
Ned's Rainbow, Publication date: 09/28/2000 DK publishing

References

External links

1964 births
Living people
English children's writers
British children's book illustrators
British women children's writers
20th-century English women writers
20th-century English writers
21st-century English women writers
Alumni of the Royal College of Art